Neoclitocybe byssiseda is a species of fungus in the family Tricholomataceae, and the type species of the genus Neoclitocybe. Initially described as Omphalia byssiseda by Giacomo Bresadola in 1907, it was transferred to Neoclitocybe by Rolf Singer in 1961. The mushroom is edible.

References

External links

Tricholomataceae